Temple of Two Suns is the second album by the German power metal band Mob Rules, released in 2000.

The basic tracks for the album were recorded at Soundgarten Studio in Oldenburg, Germany, engineered by Andreas Schulz in June 2000. Later the band gathered at Gate-Studio in Wolfsburg where, under the direction of expert producers Sascha Paeth and Miro, all the instrumental and vocal parts were recorded in July and August. The album was finally mixed and mastered by Sascha Paeth in September 2000.

Track listing
All songs written and arranged by Mob Rules

"The Temple Fanfare" - 2:24
"Pilot of Earth" - 2:49	
"Outer Space" - 3:42	
"Celebration Day (Sun Serenade, Opus I)" - 6:01
"Flag of Life (Sun Serenade, Opus II)" - 4:25
"Unknown Man" - 6:01
"Hold On" - 3:15
"Evolution's Falling" - 5:18
"Inside the Fire" - 5:01
"Eyes of All Young" - 3:54
"Hold On (Reprise)" - 5:02

Personnel

Band members
Klaus Dirks - vocals 
Matthias Mineur - guitars 
Oliver Fuhlhage - guitars 
Torsten Plorin - bass 
Arved Mannott - drums

Additional musicians
Sascha Onnen - keyboards
Thomas Rettke, Susanne Möhle, Miro - backing vocals
Sascha Paeth - additional guitars on tracks 9 and 10

Production
Andreas Schultz - engineer
Miro - engineer, keyboard editing
Sascha Paeth - mixing, mastering
Olaf Reitmeier - additional editing

References

2000 albums
Mob Rules (band) albums
Concept albums
Limb Music albums